Rajuntay is a mountain of the Andes mountain range in central Peru, part of the Andes. At .

The name means coupled snow. It is also called Raujunte.

See also
 List of mountains in the Andes

Mountains of Peru
Mountains of Junín Region